Joan Vaughan is a former international lawn bowls competitor for Australia.

Bowls career
In 1973 she won three medals at the 1973 World Outdoor Bowls Championship in Wellington. A silver medal in the triples with Olive Rowe and Mary Underwood, a bronze medal in the fours with Rowe, Lorna Lucas and Dot Jenkinson and another silver medal in the team event (Taylor Trophy).

References

Date of birth missing
Possibly living people
Year of birth missing
Australian female bowls players
20th-century Australian women